Bopp IPA: /bɑːp/ is a surname. Notable people with the surname include:

Edward S. Bopp (born 1930), American politician
Emery Bopp (1924–2007), American artist
Eugen Bopp (born 1983), Ukrainian-born German footballer
Franz Bopp (1791–1867), German linguist
Karl Bopp (1877–1934), German historian of mathematics
Thomas Bopp (1949–2018), American astronomer, co-discoverer of Comet Hale-Bopp
Yésica Bopp, (born 1984), Argentine boxer

See also
 Biaxially oriented polypropylene

German-language surnames